Persatuan Sepak Bola Buol, commonly known as Persbul Buol or Persbul, is an  Indonesian football club based in Buol Regency, Central Sulawesi. They currently compete in the Liga 3.

References

External links
Liga-Indonesia.co.id
 

Football clubs in Indonesia
Football clubs in Central Sulawesi
Association football clubs established in 1950
1950 establishments in Indonesia